This article contains information about the literary events and publications of 1707.

Events
January – The publisher Edmund Curll announces he will publish Matthew Prior's Poems on Several Occasions, even though the rights belong to someone else.
March 8 – George Farquhar's Restoration comedy The Beaux' Stratagem is first staged, at the Theatre Royal, Haymarket, London.
May 1 – The new sovereign Kingdom of Great Britain comes into being under the Acts of Union. It combines the Kingdom of England and the Kingdom of Scotland into a single realm under Anne, Queen of Great Britain. Supporters of this include Daniel Defoe and John Arbuthnot.
May 30 – Thomas Wilson, Anglican Bishop of Sodor and Man, publishes Principles and Duties of Christianity... in English and Manks (Coyrie Sodjey), the first book in the Manx language.
September 9 – Richard Steele marries Mary Scurlock. Their literary marriage gains fame through their correspondence.

New books

Prose
Anonymous
Memoirs of the Court of England (translation)
The History of the Earl of Warwick; Sirnam'd the King-maker (transl.)
Richard Baxter – The Poetical Works of the Late Richard Baxter
Thomas Brown – The Works of Mr Thomas Brown
Anthony Collins – Essay Concerning the Use of Reason
Jean de Beaugué – Histoire de la guerre d'Ecosse (translation by Patrick Abercromby)
François Pétis de la Croix (translated and adapted) – Contes Turcs (Turkish Tales)
Thomas D'Urfey – Stories, Moral and Comical
Laurence Echard – The History of England vol. 1
William Fleetwood – Chronicon Preciosum
Aaron Hart – Urim v'tumim (the first book printed in Hebrew in London)
Alain-René Lesage – Le Diable boiteux (The Devil upon Two Sticks)
Edward Lhuyd – Archaeologia Britannica: an Account of the Languages, Histories and Customs of Great Britain...
Delarivière Manley – The Lady's Pacquet of Letters (fiction)
Isaac Newton – Arithmetica Universalis
John Oldmixon – The Muses Mercury (periodical)
Matthäus Schiner – A Philippick Oration to Incite the English Against the French (translated by John Toland)
Hans Sloane – A Voyage to the Islands Madera, Barbados, Nieves, S. Christophers and Jamaica, v. 1
Dr. Thomas Smith – Vitæ quorundam Eruditissimorum et Illustrium Virorum
Jonathan Swift – A Critical Essay upon the Faculties of the Mind
Matthew Tindal – A Defence of the Rights of the Christian Church (sequel to 1706 work)
Catherine Trotter – A Discourse Concerning a Guide in Controversies
Isaac Watts – Hymns and Spiritual Songs (frequently reprinted)
John Wilmot, Earl of Rochester – The Miscellaneous Works of the Late Earls of Rochester and Roscommon

Drama
Joseph Addison – Rosamond (opera)
Susanna Centlivre – The Platonick Lady
Colley Cibber
The Lady's Last Stake
The Double Gallant
Prosper Jolyot de Crébillon – Atrée et Thyeste
George Farquhar – The Beaux' Stratagem
Alain-René Lesage – Crispin rival de son maître
Peter Anthony Motteux – Thomyris, Queen of Scythia (opera)
Nicholas Rowe – The Royal Convert
Nahum Tate – Injur'd Love (an adaptation of Webster's The White Devil)

Poetry

Samuel Cobb – Poems on Several Occasions
John Pomfret – Quae Rara, Chara (poem)
 Nicholas Rowe – A Poem Upon the Late Glorious Successes
Nahum Tate – The Triumph of Union

Births
January 13 – John Boyle, 5th Earl of Cork, English writer (died 1762)
January 28 (baptized) – John Baskerville, English printer and typographer (died 1775)
February 14 – Claude Prosper Jolyot de Crébillon, French novelist (died 1777)
February 25 – Carlo Goldoni, Venetian dramatist (died 1793)
April 20 – Robert Foulis, Scottish printer and publisher (died 1776)
April 22 – Henry Fielding, English novelist (died 1754)
June 22 (baptized) – Elizabeth Blackwell, Scottish botanic writer and illustrator (died 1758)
August 14 – Johann August Ernesti, German philologist (died 1781)
September 7 – Georges-Louis Leclerc, Comte de Buffon, French philosopher (died 1788)
December 18 – Charles Wesley, English hymnist, religious writer and cleric (died 1788)
unknown date – Moshe Chaim Luzzatto, Italian rabbi, kabbalist and philosopher (died 1746)

Deaths
January 20 – Humphrey Hody, English theologian (born 1659)
April 20 – George Farquhar, Irish dramatist (born 1677)
June 23 – John Mill, English theologian and exegete (born c. 1645)
August 17 – Petter Dass, Norwegian poet (born 1647)
September 15 – George Stepney, English poet and diplomat (born 1663)
September 23 – John Tutchin, English controversialist (born c. 1660–64)
September 24 – Vincenzo da Filicaja, Italian poet (born 1642)
December 27 – Jean Mabillon, French scholar (born 1632)

References

 
Years of the 18th century in literature